Nizza is a station of the Turin Metro. The station was opened on 6 March 2011 as part of the Line 1 extension from Porta Nuova to Lingotto.
It is in the busy, commercial district of central Torino, on the Piazza Nizza. It is located within walking distance to the Torino Exposition Center and Castello del Valentino.

Services 
 Ticket vending machines
 Handicap accessibility
 Elevators
 Escalators
 Active CCTV surveillance

References

Turin Metro stations
Railway stations opened in 2011
2011 establishments in Italy
Railway stations in Italy opened in the 21st century